K. M. Kamrul Kader (born 9 June 1964) is a Bangladeshi justice of the High Court Division Supreme Court of Bangladesh. He was appointed in 2011.

Early life 
Kader was born on 9 June 1964. He completed his bachelors and masters in law from the University of Rajshahi. He completed a second bachelors in law from the University of Wolverhampton.

Career 
On 26 October 1987, Kader started his legal practice in the district courts. Kader became a lawyer of the High Court Division on 9 October 1990. On 20 October 2011, Kader was appointed as an additional judge on the High Court Division. He became a regular judge of the High Court Division on 7 October 2013.

On 29 August 2019, Kader and Justice FRM Nazmul Ahasan issued a ruling that mandated portraits of Sheikh Mujibur Rahman be all courtrooms of Bangladesh.

On 15 February 2020, Kader and Justice FRM Nazmul Ahasan issued a ruling that asked the government to make 7 March the "historic national day"  because of the 7 March Speech of Bangabandhu.

On 10 March 2020, Kader and Justice FRM Nazmul Ahasan issued a ruling that declared Joy Bangla to be the national slogan of Bangladesh.

References

External links 
 Judges' List: High Court Division

1964 births
Living people
20th-century Bangladeshi lawyers
Supreme Court of Bangladesh justices
University of Rajshahi alumni
Alumni of the University of Wolverhampton
21st-century Bangladeshi judges